Narnaul is a city, a Municipal Council, and location of headquarters of the Mahendragarh district in the Indian state of Haryana.  It is located in the National Capital Region of India.

History 

Narnaul is built on a prominent tell, but the tell has never been excavated so the site's earliest history is unknown. The Muslim saint Shah Wilayat was living in Narnaul when he died in 1137 — over half a century before the Muslim conquest of Delhi, indicating that there was already a Muslim presence in Narnaul under Hindu rule. The dargah built in honor of Shah Wilayat has a coffered roof similar to early monuments at Ajmer and Bayana and may have been built during this early period. Some architecture from the time of the Delhi Sultanate survives in Narnaul; the earlier phases are mostly concentrated in and around the dargah complex of Shah Wilayat, while many buildings from the Lodi dynasty are found both in Narnaul itself and on the road to Delhi. These buildings are typically undated.

Narnaul is likely the birthplace of the emperor Sher Shah Suri; his family is known to have had ties here for multiple generations before him. After his defeat of Humayun in 1540, Sher Shah built a monumental tomb for his grandfather, Ibrahim Khan Suri, inside the dargah complex at Narnaul. This tomb is built in the Lodi architectural style. Later buildings from the Mughal Empire include the Jal Mahal and the octagonal tomb of Shah Quli Khan. An ornate haveli, the Chhata Rai Bal Mukund Das, reflects the "Bengali" architectural style that was spread to northern India at the time of Shah Jahan and was later popular under the Rajput princes. 

In the 1700s, Narnaul variously came under Rajput and Maratha control. The Muslim Nawab of Narnaul took part in the Indian Rebellion of 1857 and, after its suppression, the British confiscated his lands and gave them to the Maharaja of Patiala, who had sided with them during the war.

Fort 

Nivajpur Fort, built by mughal jagirdar Abhay Pradhan at Nivajpur village 10 km from Narnaul, has 3 ft wide and 20 ft high stone walls. It had a system of wells, warehouses, stables and a 42 ft wide gateway, all of which now lie in ruins.

Battle of Narnaul 
 

The Battle of Narnaul (also called Battle of Nasibpur) was fought on 16 November 1857, between the British Raj and Indian natives during the First War of Indian Independence. In 1857, Pran Sukh Yadav along with Rao Tula Ram of Rewari and Kushal Singh of Auwa fought with the British at Nasibpur village near Narnaul. The battle was one of the most ferocious battles of the First War of Indian Independence. During the Battle of Narnaul at Nasibpur on 16 November 1857, British lost 700 British soldiers and their commanders Colonel Gerrard and Captain Wallace, 400 British soldiers and  officers Captain Craige, Captain Kennedy and Captain Pearse were wounded. Colonel Gerrard died after getting mortally wounded in a military engagement against Rao Kishan Singh. Later, Pran Sukh Yadav settled at the village of Nihalpura and rehabilitated the kin of dead soldiers.

Rao Krishan Gopal, from Nangal Pathani village of Gurgaon district was the Kotwal of Meerut, who had played a prominent part in collaboration with Raja Nahar Singh of Ballabhgarh, Nawab of Jhajjar, and Rao Shahamat Khan of Mewat, by organising the patriotic forces and participating in several battles against the British troops. He and his younger brother, Rao Ram Lal, were killed in this battle of Nasibpur.

Geography 

It has an average elevation of 300 meters (977 feet). The district is rich in mineral resources such as iron ore, copper ore, beryl, tourmaline, muscovite, biotite, albite, calcite, and quartz.

Climate
In winters, the temperature can reach a low of 3 °C. In summer the highest temperature is 50 °C.

Demographics 

 India census, Narnaul had a population of 74,581.Males constitute 53% of the population and females 47%. Narnaul has an average literacy rate of 68%, higher than the national average of 59.5%: male literacy is 76%, and female literacy is 58%. In Narnaul, 14% of the population is under 6 years of age.

See also 
 Satnami revolt, in Narnaul during 1672
 Administrative divisions of Haryana

References

External links 
 Mahendragarh district website

Cities and towns in Mahendragarh district